Judith Klein-Seetharaman (born May 30, 1971) is an American-German biochemist who is a professor at the Arizona State University. Her research considers the structure-function properties of proteins using computational bio-linguistics. She was supported by the Bill & Melinda Gates Foundation to identify novel therapies to tackle HIV.

Early life and education 
Klein-Seetharaman was born in Germany. She completed her undergraduate training at the University of Cologne, where she earned dual honours in biology and chemistry. After earning her doctorate, she moved to the United States, where she worked in the laboratory of Har Gobind Khorana at the Massachusetts Institute of Technology. Her research considered conformational changes in rhodopsin, the G protein coupled receptor. She was a postdoctoral researcher at MIT with Harald Schwalbe, focusing on nuclear magnetic resonance spectroscopy. After eight months as a postdoc, Klein-Seetharaman moved Carnegie Mellon University where she worked with Raj Reddy in biology. She was eventually appointed to the faculty at Carnegie Mellon.

Research and career 
Klein-Seetharaman moved to the University of Pittsburgh as an assistant professor in 2002 and was promoted to associate professor in 2009. She joined the Warwick Medical School as a professor in medicine in 2013. She returned to the[United States in 2017, first as a professor at the Colorado School of Mines and then as a professor at the Arizona State University in 2021. Her research looks to uncover the structure-property relationships of membrane proteins.

Selected publications

References 

1972 births
Living people
German emigrants to the United States
University of Cologne alumni
Massachusetts Institute of Technology alumni
Arizona State University faculty
Biochemists
American women scientists
20th-century American scientists
21st-century American scientists
20th-century American women scientists
21st-century American women scientists